{{Infobox comedian
| name = Louie Torrellas
| image =
| caption =
| birth_name = Louie Joseph Torrellas
| birth_date = 
| birth_place = Long Island, New York, U.S.
| medium = Stand-up, film, television, entrepreneur
| nationality = American
| years_active = 1998–present
| genre = Satire, Political satire, Observational comedy, Character comedy
| subject = Race relations, racism, Latino-American culture, pop culture, human sexuality, American politics, current events, self-deprecation

| notable_works = Host in Yankees on Deck To Be Friends
| website = 
}}Louie Joseph Torrellas''' (born July 19, 1987) is an American media personality, Emmy awarded actor, comedian, producer, writer, and entrepreneur. Notable films and video games featuring Louie include Jumper, Sponk, Blood and Bone, the popular Rockstar Games Bully, and The Warriors. His recent production, “To Be Friends,” was awarded the prize for best cinematography at the Boston Film Festival.

Early life

Louie Torrellas was born in Long Island, New York to a Puerto Rican father and a Cuban mother. He has two younger sisters. His maternal grandfather was of Turkish descent and his paternal grandfather was of Spanish descent. Torrellas's father worked at WABC-TV. Torrellas grew up in Jamaica, Queens and began performing in school plays at the age of five. He went on to perform in community theater soon after at “Queens Theatre In The Park” (Flushing Meadow). He moved with his father to Manhattan to try larger performing roles. Torellas attended the Professional Performing Arts School in 7th grade.

Stand-up comedy

Torrellas began performing stand-up at the age of 10 at Carolines on Broadway. He continued to perform stand-up at night while going to school during the day. He trained at the American Comedy Institute, the New York comedy school. He began touring as a teenager, including performances in the Caribbean, California, and across the tri-state area. He was a member of the “We Got Next Tour!”, and appeared on a variety of television shows as a stand-up, including Late Night with Conan O'Brien.

While continuing to perform, Torellas also created a comedy production company called Laugh Fiend Productions. He has produced various stand-up shows at St John’s University, Stand-Up NY.

Acting

After doing a series of short films, Torrellas began working professionally at age twelve with an appearance in an AT&T commercial, and has since been in a wide variety of national and international television commercials.

During his early years of acting, he appeared primarily in comedic roles. He was a regular on the Nickelodeon/Noggin show Sponk. Torrellas then began the transition to dramatic acting by taking classes, and has appeared in episodes of Law & Order and Third Watch, as well as the mini-series Miracle's Boys. Torellas has also appeared in video games such as Grand Theft Auto, The Warriors, and Bully. His film work include Jumper, Blood and Bone, and It Runs in the Family.

Media personality
Torrellas has hosted a variety of events, television shows, and internet broadcasts. His first hosting job was on Teen Time Live when he was selected as the primary host of the project. Torellas hosted and created the Emmy-winning show Yankees on Deck''. He also hosted the Yankees' seventh inning stretch program during the 2009 season.

Ambitious media 
In 2011, Torrellas co-founded Ambitious Media, a production company with offices in New York and Los Angeles which produces fashion and music video content. They have worked for clients such as Wiz Khalifa and Machine Gun Kelly.

Filmography

References

External links

 
 

1987 births
Living people
American people of Cuban descent
American people of Puerto Rican descent
American people of Turkish descent
Male actors from New York (state)
American stand-up comedians
American male video game actors
Comedians from New York (state)
21st-century American comedians